The Junior Eurovision Song Contest 2004 was the second edition of the annual Junior Eurovision Song Contest for young singers aged eight to fifteen. It was held on 20 November 2004, in Håkons Hall, Lillehammer, Norway and lasted 2 hours and 15 minutes. It was presented by Stian Barsnes Simonsen and Nadia Hasnaoui, broadcast in twenty countries and viewed by 100 million people. Eighteen countries participated,  and  participated for the first time.

The contest was won by 9-year-old María Isabel who represented  with her song "Antes muerta que sencilla" (Better Dead Than Plain) from her debut album ¡No me toques las palmas que me conozco! which was released before the contest. Since then, Isabel has entered the charts in not only Spain but France, Italy, Scandinavia, Latin America and has gone on to release further albums in her home country.

Incidentally, the same three countries occupied the top three places as last year, just in a different order. These three countries were Spain, the United Kingdom, and Croatia.

Origins and history 

The origins of the contest date back to 2000 when Danmarks Radio held a song contest for Danish children that year and the following year. The idea was extended to a Scandinavian song competition in 2002, known as MGP Nordic, with Denmark, Norway and Sweden as participants. In November 2002, the EBU picked up the idea for a song contest featuring children and opened the competition to all EBU member broadcasters making it a pan-European event. The working title of the programme was "Eurovision Song Contest for Children", branded with the name of the EBU's already long-running and popular song competition, the Eurovision Song Contest. Denmark was asked to host the first programme that took place the following year after their experience with their own contests and the MGP Nordic.

Location

Host city selection
Norway was the third country of choice for this contest as the European Broadcasting Union (EBU) had, in May 2003, originally chosen broadcaster ITV of the United Kingdom to host the event. Shortly after the first contest in Copenhagen, it was confirmed that the next edition would be held in Manchester on 20 November 2004. However, ITV pulled out in May 2004 due to finance and scheduling problems. In August 2004, it was revealed that Granada Television, who would have co-produced the show with Carlton Television, had decided to pull out of the deal claiming the allocated budget of €1,500,000 was too small. The EBU offered funding of €900,000 to produce the event, but the ITV company said it would have cost almost €2,500,000 so asked them to find a new host broadcaster. It is also thought that another factor to their decision was the previous years' audience ratings for ITV which were below the expected amount.

The venue was therefore moved to Croatia, the winning country of 2003, but the Croatian broadcaster HRT reportedly forgot that the prospective venue for the event was already booked for the period the Junior Eurovision Song Contest was to take place. It was at this point (June 2004), with five months remaining until the event would be held, that Norwegian broadcaster NRK offered to organise the next contest. Hosting duties were confirmed by the broadcaster itself a few days later, adding that the competition would take place at Håkons Hall in Lillehammer on the same date as originally planned.

Venue

Håkons Hall, sometimes anglicized as Håkon Hall and Haakons Hall, is an arena located at Stampesletta in Lillehammer, Norway, built for the 1994 Winter Olympics. With a spectator capacity of 11,500 people, it is the largest handball and ice hockey venue in the country.

Håkons Hall is regularly used for handball and ice hockey tournaments, concerts, exhibitions, conferences and banquets. The venue is owned by Lillehammer Municipality via the subsidiary Lillehammer Olympiapark, which owns all the Olympic venues in Lillehammer. The Norwegian Olympic Museum is located in the arena, which is located next to the smaller Kristins Hall. The hall was opened on 1 February 1993 having cost 238 million Norwegian krone (NOK).

Format

Visual design
On 2 September 2004, host broadcaster NRK presented the official logo of the contest. The theme of the show was later confirmed as bright Nordic winter nights, sparkling stars and snow crystals, set in a hip-hop atmosphere.

Presenters
On 23 September 2004, it was announced that Nadia Hasnaoui and Stian Barsnes Simonsen would host the contest. The hosting couple also led the final of national qualifying rounds to the competition, Melodi Grand Prix Junior 2004 on 12 June.

Running order
The draw for the running order of the contest was held on 14 October, with Greece drawn to open the contest for a second time and Romania drawn to close.

Voting
All countries used televoting to decide on their top ten. In normal Eurovision fashion, each country's favourite song was given 12 points, their second favourite 10, and their third to tenth favourites were given 8–1 points.

Opening and interval acts
On television, the show opened with the usual EBU ident and fanfare, followed by a placard of a starry night sky with suspenseful music and the NRK logo in the middle of the card. The "JESC singing girl" would then zoom into the screen on a snowboard with the JESC 2004 logo on the bottom, and trailing behind the board would be stars. The singing girl would then hover towards a rotating disco ball, and as the camera would move closer, the words "JUNIOR EUROVISION SONG CONTEST - LILLEHAMMER 2004" would also start rotating. During this time, a person would start rapping the word "JESC" over and over again, then the placard would give way to a ceiling shot of the arena.

After the flag parade, the hosts, Stian and Nadia were to land on the stage from a snowboard. Stian landed on the left hand side of the stage, but when Nadia came through, she 'accidentally' crash-landed behind the stage. She emerged a few minutes later in comedic style coughing, but no bodily injuries were seen. Nonetheless, when she came out, the audience continued cheering and the show proceeded like it was supposed to.

The camera angle would then switch, this time to a camera positioned in the audience of the arena, where all the participants would walk through in a first ever Eurovision-related flag parade. In future editions, the flag parade would occur on the stage of the arena.

During a ten-minute break for televoting, boy band Westlife performed "Ain't That a Kick in the Head?" live on stage as the interval act.

Participating countries
Originally twenty countries had applied to take part but  and  later pulled out. There were also reports that  had planned to enter the programme. Israel, Ireland and Germany would later debut in the contest in 2012, 2015 and 2020 respectively.

This was the last contest that  and  took part in before their withdrawal in 2005. They would miss the contest for 12 and 14 years until 2016 and 2018 respectively, when they announced their return.

Participants and results

Detailed voting results

12 points 
Below is a summary of the maximum 12 points each country awarded to another:

Spokespersons 

 Kalli Georgelli
 Thea Saliba
 Danny Hoekstra
 Alessia Milani
 Ida Ursin-Holm
 Gabrielle
 Filip
 Jadwiga Jaskulski
 Stella María Koukkidi
 Darya
 Buga
 Sabīne Berezina
 Charlie Allan
 Anne Gadegaard
 Lucho
 Vännerna Queenie
 Alexander Schönfelder
 Emy

Other countries
For a country to be eligible for potential participation in the Junior Eurovision Song Contest, it needs to be an active member of the EBU. It is currently unknown whether the EBU issue invitations of participation to all 56 active members like they do for the Eurovision Song Contest.

 After failing to participate in the previous year, German broadcaster Norddeutscher Rundfunk (NDR) was announced as a debutant at the 2004 contest. However, the country later ended up pulling out before the contest. No reason for the withdrawal was given. Germany would only debut sixteen years later at the Junior Eurovision Song Contest 2020.
 Irish television was reported to have received an invitation to participate in the 2004 contest and were among the 20 countries expected to take part in Manchester. However, in the end Ireland did not debut and would stay out of the competition until .
 The Israeli Broadcasting Authority (IBA) initially planned to debut at this year's contest but the debut never happened. Israel and the IBA would not debut until .

Broadcasts

Official album

Junior Eurovision Song Contest Lillehammer '04, is a compilation album put together by the European Broadcasting Union, and was released by Universal Music Group in November 2004. The album features all the songs from the 2004 contest.

See also
 Eurovision Song Contest 2004
 Eurovision Young Musicians 2004

References

External links

 

 
2004
2004 song contests
2004 in Norwegian music
Eurovision Song Contest 2004
Lillehammer
November 2004 events in Europe
Music events in Norway
Norway in the Eurovision Song Contest